Note: This is a sublist of List of Confederate monuments and memorials from the Georgia section.

This is a list of Confederate monuments and memorials in Georgia that were established as public displays and symbols of the Confederate States of America (CSA), Confederate leaders, or Confederate soldiers of the American Civil War. Part of the commemoration of the American Civil War, these symbols include monuments and statues, flags, holidays and other observances, and the names of schools, roads, parks, bridges, counties, cities, lakes, dams, military bases, and other public works.

This list does not include items which are largely historic in nature such as historic markers or battlefield parks if they were not established to honor the Confederacy. Nor does it include figures connected with the origins of the Civil War or white supremacy, but not with the Confederacy.

Georgia has a statute making it difficult to remove Confederate monuments because it is unlawful to damage, relocate or remove any memorials honoring any military personnel of the state or USA or the Confederate States of America.

, there are at least 201 public spaces with Confederate monuments in Georgia.

State capitol 

 Statue of John Brown Gordon, Georgia State Capitol grounds (1907). "One of the leading proponents of both the New South creed and the Lost Cause, a philosophy that greatly romanticized the South's role in the war. Moreover, he is generally acknowledged as having been the head of the Ku Klux Klan in Georgia. 
 Statue of Benjamin Harvey Hill, Confederate Senator, Georgia State Capitol.
 Statue of Joe Brown and his wife. "Brown was the Confederate governor of Georgia and after the war served as [U.S.] senator. He also was an ardent secessionist. After the war, Brown served briefly as chief justice of the Georgia Supreme Court and authored an opinion upholding the state's ban on interracial marriage that described such marriages as 'productive of evil, and evil only, without any corresponding good.'... That opinion was cited in several briefs in the Supreme Court's recent decision on gay marriage as an example of how government has consistently erred in defining marriage."
 Plaque and tree honoring William Ambrose Wright, a lieutenant in the Confederate States Army, and Georgia state comptroller for fifty years, as well as insurance commissioner. Erected by the Atlanta Ladies Memorial Association, January 19, 1930.

State flag 

The current (2019) Georgia flag is based on the first national flag of the Confederacy, which was nicknamed the "Stars and Bars".

State holiday 
 Confederate Memorial Day, celebrated the last Monday in April, but officially called only "State Holiday".

Stone Mountain (state monument) 

Stone Mountain is owned by the state of Georgia. When Georgia purchased the site, "it was designated as a memorial to the Confederacy". The Stone Mountain Park officially opened on April 14, 1965 – 100 years to the day after Lincoln's assassination. Site of the rebirth of the Ku Klux Klan (the Second Clan), on the top of the mountain, with cross burning, in 1915. Stone Mountain was the location of an annual Labor Day cross-burning ceremony for the next 50 years. In 2019 it is the most-visited attraction in the state of Georgia.
 Four flags of the Confederacy are flown.
The Stone Mountain Memorial Lawn "contains...thirteen terraces — one for each Confederate state.... Each terrace flies the flag that the state flew as member of the Confederacy."
 Stone Mountain Confederate Memorial Carving, 1923–72, the largest such carving in the world.

Buildings 
 Athens: Allen D. Candler Hall at the University of Georgia (1901)
 Athens: Joseph E. Brown Hall at the University of Georgia (1932)

Monuments

Courthouse monuments 

 Blakely: Confederate Flagpole, Early County Courthouse (1861)
 Butler: Taylor County Confederate Monument (1911)
 Cairo: Confederate Soldier Monument and Flag, Grady County Courthouse
 Carnesville: Franklin County Confederate Monument (1910)
 Carrollton: Confederate Monument (1910)
 Cartersville: Confederate memorial at the Bartow County Courthouse
 Cedartown: Polk County Confederate Monument (1906)
 Clayton: Confederate Flag, Rabun County Courthouse
 Conyers: Confederate Monument (1913)
 Covington: Confederate War Memorial (1906)
 Crawfordville: Confederate Monument (1898)
 Cusseta: Confederate Veterans Monument
 Decatur: DeKalb County Confederate Monument, Decatur Square, in front of Old DeKalb County Courthouse. The monument, erected 1911, antedates the Square and also antedates the Old Courthouse. Residents are petitioning for its removal. The County Commission of DeKalb County voted 6-1 to ask its attorneys to find a legal way to remove or relocate it.
 Douglasville: Confederate War Memorial (1914)
 Dublin: Laurens County Confederate Monument (1912)
 Eastman: Confederate Monument of Eastman (1910)
 Eatonton: Birthplace of Lucius Quintus Cincinnatus Lamar (1936)
 Ellaville: Schley County Confederate Monument (1910)
 Forsyth: Confederate Monument (1907)
 Greensboro: Greene County Confederate Monument (1898)
 Hartwell: Confederate Monument (1908)
 Hawkinsville: Confederate Monument (1908)
 Hazlehurst: Jefferson Davis Bust
 Hinesville: Liberty County Confederate Monument, Liberty County Courthouse (1928)
 Jackson: Monument to Butts County Confederate Soldiers (1911)
 Jeffersonville: A shaft called Shannon's Meadow, in front of Twiggs County Courthouse.
 Lawrenceville: Lawrenceville Confederate Memorial (1990)
 Lexington: Oglethorpe County Confederate Monument (1916)
 Lumpkin: Stewart County Confederate Monument (1908), included in Lumpkin Commercial Historic District
 Macon: "Women of the South" (1911), UDC monument featuring a young soldier receiving aid from a mother and young girl, as well as a bas-relief showing both a pre-war family, and one devastated by war. Moved from city hall to a nearby park in 1934.
 McDonough: Confederate Memorial Drinking Fountain (1915)
 Millen: Jenkins County Confederate Monument, Jenkins County Courthouse (1909)
 Monroe: Confederate Monument (1907)
 Moultrie: Colquitt County Confederate Monument, Colquitt County Courthouse (1909)
 Mount Vernon: Confederate Monument, Montgomery County Courthouse (1997)
 Nashville: Confederate Memorial, Berrien County Courthouse
 Newnan. Located at the original County Courthouse, now the Coweta County Probate Court.
 Coweta County Confederate Monument. Erected 1885 by the Ladies Memorial Association; cost $2,000. A uniformed Confederate soldier stands on picket duty, holding his musket by the barrel on his proper right side, the butt of which rests by his proper right foot. The soldier wears a hat and a short cloak over a knee-length jacket. Inscription: "Our Confederate dead, / whom power could not corrupt, / whom death could not terrify, / whom defeat could not dishonor. // (Back of base) It is not in mortals / to command success. / But they did more, deserved it."
 Marker for Confederate Hospitals, on Courthouse Square. Text: "In Newnan between 1862 and 1865 were seven Confederate hospitals — Bragg, Buckner, "College Temple", "Coweta House," Foard, Gamble and Pinson's Springs. More than 10,000 Confederate sick and wounded and about 200 Federal soldiers wounded in the Battle of Brown's Mill were cared for in these hospitals and in private homes. The hospitals were directed and supervised by Samuel H. Stout, Army Medical Director Department of Tennessee. Loyal men and women of the county rendered valuable aid."
 Ocilla: Irwin County Confederate Monument (1911)
 Oglethorpe: Confederate Monument, Courthouse lawn (1923) "Erected by the Oglethorpe Chapter of the UDC in 1924. It consists of a block of Ga marble flanked by marble globes surmounted by a third globe (surrounded by a fence), sits near the courthouse, date on monument is February 20, 1993, but newspaper establishes date of dedication as April 26, 1924. Originally, it was built with a fountain near an old artesian well in the intersection of highway 49 and Sumpter Street and moved to the present site around 1935."
 Perry: Houston County Confederate Monument (1908)
 Quitman: Confederate memorial, Brooks County Courthouse
 Sparta: Hancock County Confederate Monument (1881)
 Statesboro: Confederate Memorial, Bulloch County Courthouse (1906)
 Thomaston:
 At Arms Rest Monument, Upson County Courthouse (1908)
 First Cannon Ball Monument, Upson County Courthouse (1919)
 Thomson: McDuffie and Columbia Counties Confederate Monument, McDuffie County Courthouse (1986)
 Toccoa: Stephens County Confederate Monument, county courthouse (1922)
 Valdosta: Confederate memorial, Lowdnes County Courthouse (1911)
 Vienna: Dooly County Confederate Monument, county courthouse (1908)
 Warrenton: Warren County Confederate Monument, county courthouse (1904)
 Washington: The Dissolution of the Confederate Government/Last Meeting Stone, Wilkes County Courthouse (1938)
 Watkinsville: Confederate monument (1927); first erected in Watkinsville City Park
 Wrightsville: Jefferson Davis Highway Marker located in front of the Johnson County Courthouse
 Wrightsville - Confederate Soldier memorial by Sons of Confederate Veterans

Other public monuments 

 Abbeville: Confederate Memorial Monument (1909)
 Americus: Confederate Monument (1900)
 Andersonville: Andersonville National Historic Site: Monument to Henry Wirz, Commander of the Confederate prison, Camp Sumter, at Andersonville, "where approximately thirteen thousand Union troops...died of disease, starvation, and exposure." Erected by UDC in 1909.
 Athens: Athens Confederate Monument (1872)
 Atlanta
 Jefferson Davis Highway Marker, on East College Avenue near South McDonough St. Marked U.D.C. (United Daughters of the Confederacy), June 12, 1931.
 CSA Brig. Gen. Alfred Iverson Jr. Monument
 Oakland Cemetery
 Confederate Obelisk, inscribed "Our Confederate Dead 1873", in the Confederate section of the cemetery. Made of Stone Mountain granite, it is the tallest object in the Cemetery. In 2019 the city decided to add e marker contextualizing its continued placement on state-owned property.
 Lion of the Confederacy, also known as the Lion of Atlanta, inscribed "Unknown Confederate Dead". Created to memorialize "the lost cause".... "The Lion is actually a locally made copy of the Lion of Lucerne, a memorial to hundreds of Swiss Guards who died in the service of a much different but equally lost cause: defending the royal family in Paris during the French Revolution." Mark Twain called it (the Lion of Lucerne) "the most mournful and moving piece of stone in the world." "Carved by T. M. Brady, who owned the Georgia Marble Finishing Works in Canton." It is surrounded by "the remains of 3,000 unknown Confederate dead.... It was commissioned by the Atlanta Ladies Memorial Association and dedicated on Confederate Memorial Day in 1894." In 2019 the city decided to add marker contextualizing its continued placement on state-owned property. Its intricately carved face was smashed by rioters during the first week of June 2020. 
 Peachtree Battle Avenue Monument (1935), a stone-engraved memorial commemorating the Battle of Peachtree Creek (1864). Because state law prohibits its removal, to provide "context", in 2019 a panel was added saying: "[The monument] describes the United States after the civil war as a perfected nation. This ignores the segregation and disenfranchisement of African Americans and others that still existed in 1935."
 Peace Monument (1911), Allen George Newman, sculptor, inside the 14th Street gate of Piedmont Park. Features a winged goddess declaring "Cease Firing – Peace Is Proclaimed," to a Confederate soldier holding a rifle. Defaced by protestors after the Charlottesville Unite the Right rally, August 13, 2017. A committee set up by then-Mayor Kasim Reed in 2017 recommended it be removed. Since state law prohibits this, the decision was made in 2019 to add a "contextual" panel, pointing out that the monument ignores the 200,000 African Americans that have served in the U.S. Army.
 Rhodes Hall, formerly a private mansion, features a set of stained-glass windows entitled "The Rise and Fall of the Confederacy."
 Sidney Lanier Monument (1914), a stele and bust honoring Sidney Lanier, a former Confederate soldier and the "Poet of the Confederacy".
W.H.T. Walker Monument, on the spot where he was shot and killed by a Union sniper. At intersection of Wilkinson Drive and Glenwood Avenue. One half mile to the west, at the intersection of Monument and McPherson Avenues, is a memorial erected by the U.S. Army for Major General John B. McPherson on the spot at which he was killed by Confederate forces on the same day (July 22, 1864, during the Battle of Atlanta).
Westview Cemetery Memorial. Marks the site of the Battle of Ezra Church. A soldier on an obelisk, above two small stone cannons and cannonballs. Inscribed "Nation shall not lift sword against nation" (Isaiah 2:4). Confederate flag flown, along with U.S. and Georgia flags.
 Eternal Flame of the Confederacy Monument (1939), a pre-Civil War gas streetlamp that was part of the Atlanta premiere of the film Gone with the Wind, now at the Atlanta History Center. Its plaque reads: 
The Gate City Guard was "a Confederate-era city militia". The streetlamp was originally located at the corner of Alabama and Whitehall (now Peachtree) Streets, and was moved several times prior to its installation in Underground Atlanta. Redevelopment of that area led the city to want to remove it. Since it was valued at less than $500, the Georgia law controlling historic monuments did not apply. The Atlanta History Center purchased the streetlamp for $10.
 Augusta
 Augusta Confederate Monument. Commissioned by the Ladies Memorial Association in 1875, erected in 1878. Life-size statues of Confederate Generals Robert E. Lee, Stonewall Jackson, T.R.R. Cobb and W.H.T. Walker surround the base of this monument.
 Four Southern Poets Monument, unveiled in April 1913. Commemorates Paul Hamilton Hayne (1830–1886), Sidney Lanier (1842–1881), James Ryder Randall (1839–1908), and Abram Joseph Ryan (1838–1886). All four poets are associated with the Confederate States of America.
 Baxley: Confederate memorial
 Brunswick: Confederate memorial in Hanover Square. This monument was removed on May 17, 2022, and although the City Commission voted to remove it in 2020 the final action was delayed due to legal tension. The monument is currently awaiting final relocation to Confederate Soldiers Park in Waynesville.
 Calhoun: Confederate Soldier and Memorial Arch (1927).
 Canton: Confederate Memorial Arch, Brown Park (1923).
 Cochran: Bleckley County Confederate Monument, old Cochran City School (1910).
 Cockspur Island: Immortal Six Hundred at Fort Pulaski National Monument
 Columbus:
 Confederate Monument, city street median (1879).
 Tyler Home – Ladies Aid Society Memorial, Veteran's Parkway (1936).
 Commerce: UDC monument (1941) in Spencer Park to women and veterans of the War Between the States. High school students sang Dixie at the dedication ceremony.
 Cordele: Crisp County Confederate Monument, community clubhouse (1911).
 Crawfordville: Alexander H. Stephens statue (1893), A. H. Stephens Historic Park, Crawfordville
 Cuthbert: Randolph County Confederate Monument, city park (1910).
 Dalton: Two memorials to CSA Gen. Joseph E. Johnston:
 Johnson statue (1912) in downtown Dalton. The UDC commissioned Belle Kinney to sculpt the bronze statue, in which Johnston is posed with "an expression of deep thought, with his sword resting at his feet". Kinney explained, "General Johnston, in command of an army vastly inferior in numbers to General Sherman's army, had to use his brains more than his sword; hence I made the sword subservient to the brain."
 Memorial plaque at Johnston Headquarters, Huff House
 Decatur: DeKalb County Confederate Monument. Obelisk located behind Old DeKalb County Courthouse on Decatur Square. The monument has been defaced several times. A petition is calling for its removal. According to the DeKalb County Commission, part of the problem is that no one wants it. "The county has spent months trying to find takers for the monument. Officials purchased advertisements and cold called museums and parks." Removed in 2020 following George Floyd protests.
 Douglas: Confederate memorial, corner of Peterson Avenue (U.S. Route 441 southbound) and Ward Street (U.S. Route 221 Business westbound).
 Eatonton: Eatonton Confederate Monument, median in front of the Putnam County Courthouse (1908).
 Elberton:
 "Dutchy" (dedicated 1898; removed 1900; placed on display in Elberton 1982). Wanting to promote its granite industry and honor the Lost Cause, Elberton commissioned an Italian immigrant who "had clearly never seen a Confederate soldier" to sculpt a  granite monument. Unveiled in 1898, the sculpture had a cartoonish face, bulbous eyes, and appeared to be wearing a Union Army uniform. Nicknamed "Dutchy" because it looked like a cross between a Pennsylvania Dutchman and a hippopotamus, the monument was pulled down and buried where it fell in the town square in 1900. The sculpture was exhumed in 1982, run through a local car wash, and then placed on display in the Elberton Granite Museum, where it remains.
 Elbert County Confederate Memorial (1898), Elberton Town Plaza
 Fitzgerald: Jefferson Davis Monument, Jefferson Davis Memorial Historic Site (1920).
 Fort Oglethorpe: Chickamauga & Chattanooga National Military Park. Numerous monuments and memorials to Confederate soldiers and units, as well as Union monuments.
 Franklin: Heard County Confederate Monument, Veterans Park (1999).
 Gainesville:
 "Old Joe", Hall County Confederate Monument, town square (1909).
 A totem pole honoring local Confederate soldiers was erected in 1936 at Redwine Methodist Church. The monument no longer exists.
 Statue of CSA General James Longstreet at his home
 Gray: Memorial to soldiers in the War Between the States and the World War.
 Griffin: Confederate Monument, Veterans Memorial Plaza (1909).
 Hamilton: Memorial honoring Confederate dead.
 Hawkinsville: Confederate Sons of America memorial (Confederate States of America?)
 Jefferson: Confederate memorial in the downtown.
 Jeffersonville: Confederate Memorial, across the street from the Twiggs County Courthouse (1911).
 Kingston: First Confederate Hospital of the Civil War, Main Street.
 LaFayette: Walker County Confederate Monument, John B. Gordon Hall (1909).
 LaGrange: Monument to the Confederate Soldier, median (1902).
Lincolnton: Lincoln County Confederate Monument, center of town.
 Macon: Bibb County Confederate Monument, triangle park downtown (1879). Moved to present location in 1956.
 Madison: Morgan County Confederate Monument, Hill Park (1909).
 Marietta: Confederate memorial (1908), Marietta Confederate Cemetery
McDonough: Confederate Memorial, courthouse square (1910)
 Milledgeville: Confederate Memorial Fountain, downtown median, erected by United Daughters of the Confederacy (1912).  fall. Originally across from Post Office and Courthouse; later moved to street in front of Georgia Military College. "On the front is 'CSA' and the furled battle flag with a broken shaft. Under the lion's head is a covered bowl. The soldier is standing with a gun. His heroism in the presence of the conquering foe was equaled only by his generosity to his fallen enemy. Reading around the monument, starting in the back it reads: '1861'; To the memory of the Confederate soldier  game is as imperishable as the everlasting hills,  courage is as unrivaled. Sing the dawn of civilization  name shines in undying glory to the pages of history this monument is lovingly erected by the Robert E. Lee Chapter Daughters of the Confederacy of Milledgeville, Georgia. Unconquerable patriotism and – self-sacrifice rendered, adopted the effort of his enemies. After his flag had folded forever, to destroy his proud inheritance."
 Montezuma: Macon County Confederate Monument (1911). "The first Macon County monument is currently located in Fannie Carmichael Park and faces east. It is a soldier with both hands on his grounded rifle. There are lion heads on each side. It was erected by the Phil Cook Chapter of the UDC in January 1911. The monument was moved in 1965 from the middle of Dooly Street in the middle of Montezuma."
 Monticello: Jasper County Confederate Monument, City Square (1910). "To the Confederate soldiers of Jasper County, the record of whose sublime self sacrifice and undying devotion to duty, in the service of their country is the proud heritage of a local posterity."
 Newnan: Stone monument to William Thomas Overby, called "Nathan Hale" of the Confederacy (1956). Erected 1956 by Alfred Colquitt and Newnan Chapters UDC. "
 Resaca Confederate Cemetery
 Richmond Hill: Equestrian statue of Gen. Robert E. Lee, located in J. F. Gregory City Park.
 Ringgold:
 Statue of CSA Gen. Patrick Cleburne
 "General" (1901), monument erected at the location where Confederate locomotive The General—stolen by Union Army soldiers in 1862—was finally stopped following the Great Locomotive Chase
 Sandersville: "There is a large wooden cross on a three stepped stone base dedicated by the Ladies Memorial Association in the cemetery. It was intended to serve as a tribute to Confederate war dead until a marble memorial could be erected. Now, a marble obelisk dates from 1897 (the year the local UDC chapter came about) in the Sandersville cemetery."

 Savannah:
 Colonel Francis S. Bartow Bust, Forsyth Park (1902).
 Confederate Monument, Forsyth Park (1879) (To be officially renamed "Civil War Monument" in 2018)
 General Lafayette McLaws Bust, Forsyth Park (1902).
 Silence, city-owned Laurel Grove Cemetery (1875).
 Springfield: Confederate Memorial, across from Effington County Courthouse (1923).
 Talbotton: Confederate memorial
 Tennille: "A Confederate monument was dedicated in April 1917 by the J.D. Franklin Chapter of the UDC. It originally stood in a park called the square in the middle of the town and was originally a fountain with bowls on four sides of an eight-foot shaft. The Confederate battle flag is incised on the shaft. It is currently located at the police station."
 Thomson: Monument to the Women of the Sixties, McDuffie County Chamber of Commerce (1911).
 Tifton: Tift County Confederate Memorial, Fulwood Park (1910), rededicated 1992.
 Trenton: Confederate Memorial in Veterans Park next to the town square.
 Union Point:
 Confederate Reunion Memorial, along city sidewalk (1874).
 Confederate Wayside Home Monument, wide median (1936).
 Waycross: Ware County Confederate, Phoenix Park (1910).
 Waynesboro: Confederate Memorial Cemetery, burial site of 49 Confederate soldiers
 Waynesville: Confederate Soldiers Park

Private monuments 
 Albany: Confederate Memorial Park, owned and maintained by SCV and UDC.
 Augusta: Confederate Monument at St. James United Methodist Church.
 Rome: Confederate monuments at Myrtle Hill Cemetery include:
 Nathan Bedford Forrest Monument (1909), UDC Monument
 Women of the Confederacy Monument, "erected by the Floyd County Camp of Sons of Confederate Veterans, March 9, 1910." Dedicated by Theodore Roosevelt.

Gallery

Inhabited places 
 Bartow, renamed for Francis S. Bartow in 1861.
 Bartow County, named for CSA Gen. Francis S. Bartow.
 Ben Hill County, named for CSA Sen. Benjamin Harvey Hill.
 Bleckley County, named for Logan Edwin Bleckley.
 Cook County, named for CSA Brig. Gen. Philip Cook.
 Jeff Davis County, named for CSA President Jefferson Davis.
 Lamar County, named for Lucius Quintus Cincinnatus Lamar II.
 Lanier County, named for Confederate poet and soldier Sidney Lanier.
 Stephens County, named for Alexander H. Stephens, Vice President of the Confederate States of America.
 Toombs County, named for Robert Toombs, first Sec. of State of the Confederate States of America.
 Wheeler County, named for CSA Gen. Joseph Wheeler.

Parks 
Catoosa County: monument (1977) to Confederate Gen. Bushrod Johnson, located within Chickamauga and Chattanooga National Military Park.
 Cobb County: Kennesaw Mountain National Battlefield Park, tribute to 14 generals from Georgia (1917)
 Fitzgerald: Jefferson Davis Memorial Historic Site (1920)

Public works 
 Muscogee: Stonewall Jackson Dam

Roads 

 Andersonville: Robert E. Lee Street
 Atlanta
 Cleburne Avenue and Cleburne Terrace, named for Confederate major general Patrick Cleburne
 Confederate Avenue and East Confederate Avenue. Renamed to United Avenue and United Avenue S.E. on October 3, 2018 
 Confederate Court. Renamed Trestletree Court on October 3, 2018.
 Forrest Street, named for Nathan Bedford Forrest, a CSA general and founder of the Ku Klux Klan.  Forrest Avenue was renamed in 1980.
 Gordon Place, named for Confederate general John B. Gordon
 Hardee Circle and Hardee Street, named for Confederate general William J. Hardee 
 Holtzclaw Street, named for Confederate general James T. Holtzclaw
 Memorial Drive, links downtown Atlanta with the Confederate Memorial at Stone Mountain
 Walker Street, named for Confederate general James George Walker
 Augusta: Wheeler Road
 Brunswick: General Robert E. Lee Road
 Buford: General Lee Way
 Columbus: Robert E. Lee Drive
 Dallas: Confederate Avenue
 Eastman: Jefferson Davis Memorial Road
 Fayetteville
 Jeff Davis Drive
 Lanier Avenue
 Fitzgerald:
 Bragg Street
 Gordon Street
 Hill Street
 Jackson Street
 Jeff Davis Park Road
 Lee Street
 Logan Street
 Longstreet Street
 Thomas Street
 Forest Park:
 Hood Avenue
 Wheeler Drive
 Fort Oglethorpe:
 Forrest Road
 Polk Circle
 Robert E. Lee Street
 Shelby Street
 Franklin: Jeff Davis Road
 Gainesville: Longstreet Bridge
 Greensboro: Jefferson Davis Road
 Hazlehurst: Jeff Davis Street
 Jonesboro:
 Jeb Stuart Drive
 Jeff Davis Drive
 Robert E. Lee Parkway
 Stonewall Jackson Drive
 Kennesaw: Dreux Court, named for Confederate Colonel Charles Didier Dreux
 LaGrange: Ben Hill Street
 Lyons: Jeff Davis Avenue
 Macon:
 General Lee Road
 Jeff Davis Street
 Newnan:
 General Lee Drive
 General Longstreet Line
 Jeb Stuart Drive
 Ringgold: Robert E. Lee Drive
 Savannah:
 Colonel Francis S. Bartow Bust
 Early Street
 Hampton Street
 Jackson Boulevard
 Johnston Boulevard
 Lee Boulevard
 McClaws Street
 Mosby Street
 Stuart Street
 Wheeler Street
 Sharpsburg:
 Bedford Forrest Drive
 Thomas Overby Drive
 Stone Mountain:
 Jefferson Davis Drive
 Robert E. Lee Boulevard
 Stonewall Jackson Drive
 John B. Gordon Drive
 Thomaston: Jeff Davis Road, John b Gordon School road, John b Gordon spur, Lee street(east and west).
 Thomasville: John B. Gordon Spur
 Warner Robins: General Lee Road
 Washington: Robert Toombs Avenue
 Waycross:
 Jeb Stuart Drive
 Stonewall Jackson Place
 Chatham County: The Immortal Six Hundred Memorial Highway, a stretch of US 80 between Savannah and Tybee Island, near Fort Pulaski

Schools 
 Atlanta:
 Joseph E. Brown Middle School- now Herman J. Russell West End Academy.
 A granite memorial to the Confederacy is in front of E. Rivers Elementary School
Lanier University, short-lived university, first Baptist, then owned by the Ku Klux Klan for a year
Brunswick: The Sidney Lanier Building (previously Sidney Lanier Elementary School) on the campus of Glynn Academy
Buford: Lanier Middle School
Gainesville: Lanier Elementary School
 Hazlehurst: Jeff Davis Elementary, High School, Middle School, and Primary School
Marietta: Wheeler High School
 Oakwood: Lanier Technical College
 Sugar Hill: Lanier High School
 Thomaston: Robert E. Lee High School
 Zebulon: Jeff Davis Institute, a former school

City symbols 
 Trenton, Georgia: City council was upset the State's 1956 flag was being changed. Faced with the threat of a funding cut if they refused to fly the 2001 State flag, the city adopted a modified 1956 flag complete with the Confederate Battle Flag as their city flag in 2002. When the new mayor removed the city flag in 2004, objections were raised by the Sons of Confederate Veterans and a 2005 referendum confirmed the flag 278–64.

Photos

See also
 Removal of Confederate monuments and memorials#Georgia

References

Notes

References

Georgia
Confederate Monuments
 
Confederate monuments and memorials in Georgia
Lost Cause of the Confederacy
Sons of Confederate Veterans
United Daughters of the Confederacy monuments and memorials